Adrienne Margaret Ryan (née Butterworth; born 19 October 1960 in Skipton, Yorkshire) is a former Councillor and Mayor of Ku-ring-gai Council in Sydney, New South Wales.  She was married to former Commissioner of the New South Wales Police Peter Ryan. They divorced in 2011 after an extended separation.

Miscellaneous 
She and her two daughters moved to Sydney in 1997 when her husband became the NSW (New South Wales) Police Commissioner. Prior to coming to Australia, Ryan was also a police officer for a period of time, being involved in the Brixton Riots and Notting Hill race riots in the 1980s.  She has an honours degree in politics and international relations from Reading University in the United Kingdom.

Ryan has two daughters, Elizabeth Ryan (born 29 March 1988) and Georgina Ryan (born 1 September 1989) but had multiple miscarriages. In 2000, she published a book called A Silent Love about the impact of miscarriage and stillbirth.

In May 2005, Ryan moved to the Sydney suburb of Wahroonga after separating from her husband. She studied law at The University of Law, Bloomsbury in the United Kingdom. In 2014 she was Called to the Bar at The Honourable Society of The Middle Temple. She is a Harmsworth Scholar of the Middle Temple.

In 2012 it was revealed that Ryan and her husband had been placed under surveillance in 1999 by the Special Crime and Internal Affairs (SCIA) branch of NSW Police as the head of SCIA, assistant commissioner Mal Brammer, believed the Ryans, under the influence of alcohol, might be loose-lipped about confidential police affairs. Assistant Commissioner Brammer at no time believed that allegation, the NSW Crime Commission received a complaint from a source known to them which was investigated under their secrecy provisions. The investigation found no tangible evidence to support the allegation.

References

Living people
New South Wales local councillors
Australian writers
English emigrants to Australia
Naturalised citizens of Australia
Women Metropolitan Police officers
Alumni of the University of Reading
Shire Presidents and Mayors of Ku-ring-gai
Year of birth missing (living people)
Metropolitan Police officers
Women local councillors in Australia
Women mayors of places in New South Wales